The Kings League (officially known as the Kings League Infojobs since December 2022 due to sponsorship reasons) is a Spanish seven-a-side football league established in 2022 by Gerard Piqué, in association with other notable football personalities and internet streamers. The league features rules that differ from traditional football regulations with the aim of adding an element of dynamism and entertainment to the games, such as a tie-breaker penalty shootout, the allowance of handballs for throw-ins, unlimited substitutions, and the implementation of special "secret weapons". The inaugural season of the league began on January 1st, 2023, and has garnered significant viewership, with over 1.3 million viewers tuning in for the third round of matches.

Format
The Kings League follows an Apertura and Clausura-style format in which each season is divided into two splits: the Winter Split and the Summer Split. Both splits have their own league stage and playoffs, and during the league stage, the twelve teams play eleven matchdays and face every other team once. The top eight teams based on their rankings at the end of the league stage advance to the playoffs. Each matchday features six forty-minute matches, which are divided into two twenty-minute halves, and are played consecutively on the same ground.

For the inaugural season, players were given the opportunity to apply and were selected through a draft process that took place on December 27, 2022. Prospective players underwent physical and skill testing before the top prospects were allocated to teams. Each team selected ten players, with two additional roster slots reserved for guest players, such as footballers or streamers, who are known as the 11th Player and 12th Player. These 11th and 12th Players can change on each match day, the 11th player is meant to stay with the team for the entire season.

The league also has plans to establish a version for female players, which is called the Queens League.

Rules 
The Kings League has a set of rules that have been created through a voting process conducted on social media platforms, where fans were given the opportunity to contribute and vote on the rules.

These rules include a tie-breaker penalty shootout from the center of the field, the use of offsides, the allowance of handballs for throw-ins, unlimited substitutions, yellow cards resulting in a 2-minute exclusion, and red cards resulting in a 5-minute exclusion until a substitute can enter. The game starts with the ball in the center of the field and players starting from the back line, player numbers ranging from 0 to 99, games are divided into two 20-minute halves, and there is the inclusion of special "secret weapons" that each team can use once per game. These secret weapons include a penalty kick in their favor, a shootout in their favor, the exclusion of an opposing player for 2 minutes, a double goal for 2 minutes, a wildcard, and the ability to steal an opposing team's secret weapon card.

Venue 
The Kings League is being held at the Cupra Arena, located in the port of Barcelona. The Cupra Arena is part of the Logistics Activities Area (ZAL in Spanish) of the Port of Barcelona. On 20 January 2023, Gerard Piqué and FC Barcelona president Joan Laporta announced that the semifinals, final and third place match of the winter split playoffs would be held as a 'Final Four' event at the Camp Nou, the home ground of FC Barcelona, on March 26, 2023.

Coverage
All matches of the Kings League will be available for live streaming on the league's official Twitch, YouTube and TikTok channels, as well as on the individual channels of the team chairpersons, and it will be free for viewers to watch.

Kings League has been growing in popularity, as reflected in the increasing audience numbers. The tournament reached an average audience of 450,000 viewers in the first round, peaking at 780,000 viewers during the match between Saiyans FC and Porcinos FC. In the second round, the average audience grew to 558,200 viewers, with a peak of 945,000 viewers during the match between xBuyer Team and Kunisports. And in the third round, it broke the record again, with the match between Ultimate Móstoles and Xbuyer Team gathering more than 1.3 million people.

On 13 March 2023, it was announced that Catalan public broadcaster Televisió de Catalunya would air the Winter Split playoffs final, slated for 26 March, live on its main channel TV3.

Criticism
The Kings League has been met with mixed reactions from fans and critics alike. One of the most controversial aspects of the league is its use of wild card rules, which allow teams to draw bonuses such as penalties, goal multipliers, and head-starts before the match begins. Most of the rules have been decided by the community through social media pools.

Additionally, the second matchday featured a mysterious player for XBUYER TEAM wearing a lucha libre mask and body-covering gear, known only as "Enigma." Despite speculation that the player could be a well-known professional, the identity of Enigma remains unknown; however, it is speculated that he could be former Cádiz forward Nano Mesa, who is currently a free agent.

La Liga president Javier Tebas has criticized the Kings League, calling it a "circus." However, Kings League president Gerard Piqué defended the league, stating that in order to attract a younger audience, the league must create shorter and more entertaining content. He also argued that if matches are to be 90 minutes long, the league "should at least introduce more stimulating rules."

Teams
The list of competing teams and their 'chairpersons', the personalities in charge of managing them, was revealed during the league's launch livestream on 10 November 2022.

Notable guest players
Kings League teams have the possibility to invite one player (the "12th Player") each matchday.

Season 1 (2023)
The inaugural season started on 1 January 2023 and is scheduled to end on 26 March 2023.

Performances by team 

q. Virtually qualified for upcoming playoffs.

Sister competitions

Queens League

Shortly after the inaugural season of the Kings League started Oriol Querol, CEO of Kings League and Kosmos Holding director, announced the Queens League, a competition for women. Starting on May 2023, Queens League matches will be played on Saturdays, while the Kings League will remain on Sundays. Former Spanish players like Priscila Borja and Willy offered themselves to play the Queens League. Ibai Llanos via Twitter, was the first one to confirm the creation of his women's team called Porcinas. Former player Borja Fernández offered himself to coach the team.

The Queens League was officially launched on 24 February 2023, with all of the Kings League teams taking part in the new tournament, but some of them having slightly altered names and/or female streamers joining in as co-chairwomen.

Prince Cup

On February 10's ChupChup (a stream about Kings League hosted by Gerard Piqué, Oriol Querol and Kings League chairmen) the creation of a small tournament for kids during August and December. Piqué compared this tournament to Brunete's (now called LaLiga Promises) one.

International expansion

On 26 February 2023, shortly before Ronaldinho featured as the 12th player for Porcinos FC in their match against PIO FC, Kings League chairman Gerard Piqué announced him as the chairman of one of the teams for the upcoming Brazilian version of the league. At this time it is not known whether the Kings League name will be kept for the Brazilian or other future international versions of the league.

On March 2023, league CEO Oriol Querol stated that they had a goal to expand the Kings League format to multiple countries, in the hopes to organize a Kings League world championship with the best teams from each region as early as fall 2024. Mexico was reported to be a potential host country for the international tournament.

External links
 Official website
 Official Twitch chanel

References

Football leagues in Spain